St Gregory's Church, Norwich is a Grade I listed redundant parish church in the Church of England in Norwich.

History
The church, which stands between Pottergate and St Benedict's Street, is medieval. The body of the church dates back to a 14th-century rebuilding, although the tower is older. St Gregory's is noted for its wall-paintings, which include a depiction St George and the dragon at the west end of the north aisle.

There is a public passageway under the chancel, which was rebuilt in 1394. The west tower once had a lead-covered spire, bearing the date 1697, but this was removed in 1840.

Most of the stained glass dates back to the late 19th century, and was made by J and J King of Norwich.

The building is managed by the Norwich Historic Churches Trust. After being made redundant as a parish church, it was used as an arts centre, which closed in September 2012. The following year it was leased out for use as an antiques centre.

Organ
The church has an organ dating from 1887 by Norman Brothers. A specification of the organ can be found on the National Pipe Organ Register.

References

Church of England church buildings in Norwich
14th-century church buildings in England
Grade I listed buildings in Norfolk